Antoine Année (Avremesnil in pays de Caux, near Dieppe, 22 August 1770 – Paris, 27 March 1846) was an 18th/19th-century French playwright and journalist.

Année embraced early on the cause of freedom, but being in Paris at the times of the 20 June, the 10 August and the September Massacres, misfortunes and events made a deep impression on him, since he never ceased to rise against its excesses. During the reign of Terror, he was in the army, shelter and security asylum for men who did not occupy positions high enough to give rise to desire or arouse the fears of authority.

It was still too near the system against which he stood and his newspaper only numbered some twenty issues. The men who had played leading roles were still too powerful for such paper to be published with impunity and Année was forced to abandon it.

At a time when the critic Julien Louis Geoffroy threw consternation behind the scenes, Année gathered his various judgments, opposed them to each other and wrote a book that was assigned to Pigault-Lebrun.

Theatre 
Arlequin-décorateur, comédie-parade in 1 act and in prose, mingled with vaudevilles, with Nicolas Gersin and Alexandre de Ferrière, Paris, Théâtre du Vaudeville, 24 August 1798 Text online
Le Carrosse espagnol, ou Pourquoi faire ? comédie-vaudeville in 1 act and in prose, with Nicolas Gersin and Étienne de Jouy, Paris, Vaudeville, 4 January 1800
Gilles ventriloque, parade mingled with vaudevilles, in 1 act, with Nicolas Gersin and Pierre-Ange Vieillard, Paris, Vaudeville, 5 March 1800 Text online
Une nuit d'été, ou Un peu d'aide fait grand bien, opéra comique in 3 acts, with Nicolas Gersin, music by Arthur Pougin, Paris, Opéra-Comique, 7 June 1800
Le Premier Homme du monde, ou la Création du sommeil, folie-vaudeville in 1 act, with Pierre-Ange Vieillard, Paris, Opéra-Comique, 30 December 1800
Un tour de soubrette, comedy in 1 act and in prose, avec Nicolas Gersin, Paris, Théâtre Louvois, 21 February 1805
Les Travestissements, comedy in 1 act and in prose, avec Nicolas Gersin et Pierre-Ange Vieillard, Paris, Louvois, 7 August 1805
Une heure de caprice, comedy in 1 act, mingled with vaudevilles, with Nicolas Gersin, Paris, Vaudeville, 1 Octobre 1805

Sources 
 Antoine-Vincent Arnault, Antoine Jay, Étienne de Jouy, Biographie nouvelle des contemporains, t. 1er, Librairie historique, Paris, p. 191-2.

19th-century French dramatists and playwrights
19th-century French journalists
French male journalists
French literary critics
Writers from Normandy
1770 births
1846 deaths
19th-century French male writers
People from Dieppe, Seine-Maritime